Real Club Deportivo de La Coruña 1992-1993 season included its 28th season in La Liga, where it finished in 3rd place. The club also competed in the Copa del Rey.

Summary

Having only survived their first season back in La Liga thanks to a relegation playoff victory over Real Betis, Deportivo's 1992–93 season represented a vast improvement. Coach Arsenio Iglesias, the architect of their promotion in 1990–91, had returned to the club to begin his fourth spell as manager in the middle of the previous season, following the sacking of Marco Antonio Boronat, and guided Depor to third place in the league, only four points behind champions Barcelona. This was their best finish in the top flight since finishing as runners-up in 1949–50. Brazilian striker Bebeto, signed that summer from Vasco da Gama, scored 29 goals in the league, which was enough to become the first Deportivo player in history to win the Pichichi Trophy. They had less success in the Copa del Rey, where they were eliminated on penalties in the fourth round by Segunda División side Mérida.

Players

Squad
Source:

Left club during season
Source:

Transfers

In

Out

Statistics
Last updated on 1 May 2021.

|-
|colspan="14"|Players who have left the club after the start of the season:

|}

Competitions

La Liga

League table

Positions by round

Matches

References

Deportivo de La Coruna
Deportivo de La Coruña seasons